Joshua Francis Chadbourne (April 30, 1873 – December 5, 1959) was born in Centerville (Alameda County), California and died in Fremont, California. He was a businessman who opened the first auto mechanic shop between Hayward, California and San Jose, California in Irvington, California. He also owned a large apricot orchard in Irvington. Chadbourne Elementary School (an elementary school in the Fremont Unified School District) was named after him, as the benefactor of the land for
the school.

References

1873 births
1959 deaths
People from Fremont, California
Businesspeople from California